David Gamble (born 24 June 1955) is a British film editor who was nominated at the 1998 Academy Awards for Best Film Editing for the film Shakespeare in Love.
He also won the BAFTA Award in 1998, for Shakespeare in Love.

Selected filmography

Shopgirl (2005)
Veronica Guerin (2003)
Shakespeare in Love (1998)

References

External links

1955 births
Living people
Best Editing BAFTA Award winners
English film editors